God and the Man is a 1918 British silent drama film directed by Edwin J. Collins and starring Langhorn Burton, Joyce Carey and Bert Wynne. It was adapted from an 1881 novel by Robert Buchanan.

Cast
 Langhorn Burton - Christiansen
 Joyce Carey - Priscilla Sefton
 Bert Wynne - Richard Christiansen
 Edith Craig - Dame Christiansen
 Sybil Arundale - Kate Orchardson
 Henry Vibart - Mr. Sefton
 Nelson Ramsey - Squire Christiansen
 E. Vivian Reynolds - John Wesley

References

External links
 

1918 films
British drama films
British silent feature films
Films directed by Edwin J. Collins
1918 drama films
Films based on British novels
Ideal Film Company films
British black-and-white films
1910s English-language films
1910s British films
Silent drama films